Home for Orphans is a compilation album by the Reigning Sound. It was released in 2005 on Sympathy for the Record Industry. The album features the original Reigning Sound lineup of Greg Cartwright on lead vocals and guitar; Alex Greene on organ, piano, guitar, and backing vocals; Jeremy Scott on bass, and backing vocals; and Greg Roberson on drums. . This album mainly consists of slower, moodier outtakes from the Too Much Guitar recording sessions, as well as a some covers, including "Without You," a Gene Clark cover. An alternate version of "If Christmas Can't Bring You Home" (originally released on a 45rpm by Norton Records), a Reigning Sound original holiday song, also appears.

Track listing 

"Find Me Now" (Cartwright) - 2:14
"If You Can't Give Me Everything" (Cartwright) - 3:48
"Funny Thing"	(Cartwright)- 3:07
"Medication Blues #1"	(Cartwright)- 3:43
"Carol" (Cartwright)- 2:21
"What Could I Do?" (Cartwright)- 2:37
"If Christmas Can't Bring You Home" (Cartwright)- 2:28
"Pretty Girl"	(Cartwright)- 2:51
"Without You" (Clark)- 2:43
"Don't Send Me No Flowers, I Ain't Dead Yet" [live] (Weiss) - 2:29

Credits
 Reigning Sound - Main performer
 Greg Cartwright - Guitar, producer, vocals
 Alex Greene - Organ, guitar, vocals (background)
 Jeremy Scott - Bass, vocals (background), vocals
 Greg Roberson - Drums

References
 Evert. Reigning Sound. "www.grunnenrocks.com". Accessed Feb. 11, 2010.
 Jeffries, Vincent. [ Home For Orphans]. "www.allmusic.com". 2005 All Media Guide, LLC. Accessed Feb. 11, 2010.
 Deusner, Stephen. Home For Orphans review. "www.pitchfork.com". Accessed Feb. 11, 2010.

Reigning Sound albums
2005 compilation albums